The 1999 Liverpool Victoria UK Championship was a professional ranking snooker tournament that took place at the Bournemouth International Centre in Bournemouth, England. The event started on 13 November 1999 and the televised stages were shown on the BBC between 20 and 28 November 1999.

Stephen Hendry became the first player to make two maximum breaks in the tournament's history after scoring a 147 against Paul Wykes in the last 16.

In the final Mark Williams defeated Matthew Stevens 10–8. This was Stevens' second consecutive final at the event.

Tournament summary

Defending champion John Higgins was the number 1 seed with World Champion Stephen Hendry seeded 2. The remaining places were allocated to players based on the world rankings.

Main draw

Final

Qualifying
 
Round of 128  Best of 11 frames

 David McLellan 6–4 Mark Bennett 

 Stuart Bingham 6–5 Kristján Helgason 

 Ian Brumby 6–1 Chris Scanlon 

 Paul Sweeny 6–5 Leigh Griffin 

 Sean Storey 6–2 Adrian Gunnell 

 Gareth Chilcott 6–2 Dene O'Kane 

 Ali Carter 6–3 Stephen O'Connor 

 Michael Holt 6–5 James Reynolds 

 Tony Jones 6–5 Hugh Abernethy 

 Mark Fenton 6–1 Dennis Taylor 

 Nick Pearce 6–2 Peter McCullagh 

 Martin Dziewialtowski 6–2 Munraj Pal 

 Mehmet Husnu 6–5 Tony Chappel 

 Craig Harrison 6–3 Craig MacGillivray

 Wayne Brown 6–3 Lee Richardson 

 Karl Burrows 6–5 Barry Pinches 

 Mark Selby 6–3 Tony Knowles 

 Michael Judge 6–3 Mario Geudens 

 Robert Milkins 6–2 Karl Broughton 

 Wayne Jones 6–3 Leo Fernandez 

 Shokat Ali 6–3 Nick Dyson 

 John Lardner 6–3 Wayne Saidler 

 Mark Davis 6–2 Patrick Delsemme 

 Patrick Wallace 6–5 Darren Clarke 

 Mark Gray 6–0 Eddie Manning 

 Anthony Davies 6–2 Ryan Day 

 Steve Judd 6–2 Nick Terry 

 Phaitoon Phonbun 6–2 Richard King 

 Stephen Maguire 6–5 Stefan Mazrocis 

 Willie Thorne 6–2 Mike Dunn 

 Stuart Pettman 6–3 Noppadon Noppachorn 

 Troy Shaw 6–3 Robin Hull 

Round of 96  Best of 11 frames

 David McLellan w/o–w/d Alain Robidoux 

 Jonathan Birch 6–3 Stuart Bingham 

 Ian Brumby 6–2 Euan Henderson 

 Paul Sweeny 6–2 Matthew Couch 

 Lee Walker 6–4 Sean Storey 

 Jimmy Michie 6–4 Gareth Chilcott 

 Gary Ponting 6–3 Ali Carter 

 Michael Holt 6–4 Peter Lines 

 Joe Johnson 6–4 Tony Jones 

 Mark Fenton 6–0 Jason Prince 

 Alfie Burden 6–5 Nick Pearce 

 Joe Perry 6–3 Martin Dziewialtowski 

 David Roe 6–5 Mehmet Husnu 

 Marco Fu 6–0 Craig Harrison 

 Wayne Brown 6–2 Nick Walker 

 Steve James 6–4 Karl Burrows 

 Mark Selby 6–4 John Read 

 Michael Judge 6–3 Gerard Greene 

 Robert Milkins 6–2 Rod Lawler 

 Paul Davies 6–3 Wayne Jones 

 Shokat Ali 6–3 Dean Reynolds 

 David Gray 6–4 John Lardner 

 Drew Henry 6–2 Mark Davis 

 Patrick Wallace 6–4 Marcus Campbell 

 Mark Gray 6–2 Martin Clark 

 Anthony Davies 6–3 Bradley Jones 

 Mick Price 6–5 Steve Judd 

 Phaitoon Phonbun 6–5 Dave Finbow 

 Stephen Maguire 6–4 Ian McCulloch 

 Paul Wykes 6–2 Willie Thorne 

 Stuart Pettman 6–2 Neal Foulds 

 Jason Ferguson 6–3 Troy Shaw

Century breaks

References

1999
UK Championship
UK Championship
UK Championship